John Thomas Ramsay (18 February 1930 – 13 November 1983) was an Australian rules footballer who played with Essendon in the Victorian Football League (VFL).

Football

Essendon (VFL)
He won a reserves premiership with Essendon in 1950; and, in 1952, he played at centre half-back, and was one of the best on the ground, in the highly talented Essendon Seconds Premiership team that beat Collingwood Seconds 7.14 (56) to 4.5 (29):

Excluding the senior games that some had already played (or would go on to play) with other VFL clubs, the members of the Essendon 1952 Seconds Premiership Team played an aggregate total of 1072 senior games for Essendon Firsts.

Williamstown (VFA)
Ramsay later played for Williamstown in the Victorian Football Association, with whom he won four premierships.

Notes

References
 
 Maplestone, M., Flying Higher: History of the Essendon Football Club 1872–1996, Essendon Football Club, (Melbourne), 1996.

External links 		

John Ramsay's playing statistics from The VFA Project

Essendon Football Club past player profile
		
		
1930 births
1983 deaths
Australian rules footballers from Victoria (Australia)
Essendon Football Club players
Williamstown Football Club players